Filippos Filippou (born June 24, 1975 in Limassol) is a retired football player who played as a defender. His former teams are Aris Limassol, Atromitos Yeroskipou, Apollon Limassol, Olympiakos Nicosia, Nea Salamina and APOP Kinyras Peyias.

External links
 

1975 births
Living people
Cypriot footballers
Cyprus international footballers
Sportspeople from Limassol
Apollon Limassol FC players
Olympiakos Nicosia players
Nea Salamis Famagusta FC players
APOP Kinyras FC players
Atromitos Yeroskipou players
Aris Limassol FC players
Chalkanoras Idaliou players
Cypriot First Division players

Association football defenders